Financial Center is a high-rise building located in the downtown area of Des Moines, Iowa. It was the tallest building in the city and state until the completion of the Ruan Center in 1975, and is currently the fourth tallest. It was built in the international style, an architectural style that was particularly popular at the time of the building's construction.

The building consists mainly of office space and is connected to Des Moines' skywalk system. The ground floor includes a Walgreens location, and housed a Wells Fargo History Museum from November 2016 until 2020.

See also
Des Moines, Iowa
List of tallest buildings in Iowa

References

Modernist architecture in Iowa
Office buildings completed in 1973
Skyscraper office buildings in Des Moines, Iowa
1973 establishments in Iowa